Bandaranayake Central College, Veyangoda (Sinhala:වේයන්ගොඩ බණ්ඩාරනායක මධ්‍ය විද්‍යාලය), also known as “Veyangoda Central College (VCC)”, is a National school in Sri Lanka. The school was originally one of the three first Central Colleges established under the education reforms of late Hon. C. W. W. Kannangara, who introduced free education in Sri Lanka. Today about 2640 students are studying from grade 6 to 13 and academic staff of 135 are engaged in the teaching process.

History 
C.W.W Kannangara was Sri Lanka's first Minister of Education. On 6 January 1941 three central colleges, Veyangoda, Akuramboda, and Weeraketiya were opened by C.W.W Kannangara, Sri Lanka's first Minister of Education. Veyangoda Central College was created by joining three schools. They are Veyangoda Swabasha Patashalawa (Sinhala school), English school and Paththalagethara School which were in the same place where the President College, Veyangoda situated today, in the middle of Veyangoda town.

Later the school was moved into Maligathanna Watta and first building was opened by Mr.D.S. Senanayaka on 3 September 1951.

The school originally had 20 class rooms and two hostels, one for girls and one for boys, and two buildings for Home science and Vocational Training. Now there are 51 class rooms, an agriculture unit, a computer resource center and a computer lab in the college. Every pupil is entered to the college who passes the Grade 5 Scholarship Examination or G.C.E(O/L) Examination with highest results.

The College today

Today the school educates close to 3000 students. To accomplish this task the school is fully equipped with all the required facilities such as lecture halls, science & computer laboratories, auditoriums etc. This includes the 'College Hall'  which is looks like a national theatre.  For many years the school has maintained an excellent academic record with its students achieving the highest grades at all national exams held annually. The main medium of education had been English, however with Sinhala becoming the official language. Since 2002 English has been reintroduced as a medium of education at the College. Students may select one of the two mediums to conduct their studies in.

Sport And School Bands are the major parts of Veyangoda Central since the olden days. Therefore, the school has developed its sports infrastructure to the finest standards.

Latest rankings of the college
Bandaranayake Central College is performing top ranks throughout all the schools in Sri Lanka.

7th place out of the all Island Schools at G.C.E(O/L) Examination - 2014
11th place out of the all Island Schools at G.C.E(O/L) Examination - 2012
7th place out of the all Island Schools at G.C.E(O/L) Examination - 2011

Inter house sports meet and houses
The yearly sports meet is a colorful event of the school in every year. This event is to be held in the first study term in each year. Grade 7 to 12 students can play in the inter-house meet and this is a great opportunity to show their skills. Teachers as well as old students of the school participate. School invites to a unique character of the school as a chief guest of the closing ceremony of the houses meet.

The students of our school are divided into four houses when they admit to the school from grade 5 scholarship examination:
 Gamunu (ගැමුණු) - Color : 
 Vijaya (විජය) - Color : 
 Thissa (තිස්ස) - Color : 
 Parakrama (පරාක්‍රම) - Color : 

The names are derived from distinguished past kings of Sri Lanka. The houses compete annually in all major games to win the respective inter-house games. This is a great opportunity for young students to enhance their skills.

Latest projects 

The college has a play ground with 400m track. But it did not have a pavilion to suit its standard. The Past Pupils' Association(PPA) therefore embarked on building a Pavilion at a cost of Rs. 12.0 Mn. The construction commenced with the ceremonial laying of the foundation stone by Hon Bandula Gunawardane, the Minister of Education on 29 July 2010.
The first phase of the pavilion was opened in March 2015 with a charm function and Pirith chanting. The next phases are now being continued to develop the main ground of the college.

Facilities 
Being a national school as well as the 1st three Central Schools in Sri Lanka, Bandaranayake Central College has been well equipped with latest facilities and functions among schools. Recent mega projects with help of Sri Lankan government, Past Pupils' Association(PPA) and well-wishers, addressed some important issues such as the project of the school main play Ground Pavilion, Balcony for the main hall, Mahindyodaya Laboratory and other infrastructuring projects.

Sports
Sports play a dominant role in the school's regular activities, apart from the academics. Being the oldest of its sort in Gampaha with a history dating back to years, and the Boxing, Cricket, National Volleyball are much anticipated events of the college fixtures.

Principals' list

Notable teachers
The College has a very big list of notable teachers since its beginning.

Some of them are; 
 Most Venerable Karandetiyana Gunananda Thera
 Mr. Ramanayake   (Combined Mathematics)
 Mrs. Sandagiri   (Sinhala)
 Mrs Wallipuram  (Science)
 Mr. Ariyarathan  (Geography)
 Mr. Weedagama   (Music)

Past Pupils' Association (PPA)
Veyangoda Central had many achievements apart from excellence in academics in the past. It had won All Ceylon Wrestling Tournament for 9 consecutive years. This is the first school to win both De Soyza Trophy and Herman Loose Trophy together for junior and senior cadet platoons at annual camps in Diyathalawa. The Past Students’ Association reorganised in 1991 had a rapid growth over the years and become the strongest PPA in all the schools in the district. It has currently a life membership of over 1350. PPA having motivated to help maintain good standing in both academic and other activities of the college, generously contributed in many ways, including annual scholarship programme during this period.

Important annual events

Gallery

References

No References yet.

External links

 School's Official Website
 School's PPA Union
 School's Media Unit
 Facebook Fan Page
 Twitter Profile

National schools in Sri Lanka